Arthur Saxon Dennett Smith (27 February 1883 – 22 November 1950) was a Cornish bard, writer and linguist, known by the bardic name Caradar. He taught Modern Languages at Blundell's School, Tiverton, Devon. 
He was born in Hurstpierpoint, Sussex, England, of Cornish parents, Harriet Annie and Arthur Smith, and became a collaborator with Robert Morton Nance and Henry Jenner on the Gerlyver noweth Kernewek ha Sawsnek (Cornish-English dictionary). He compiled several grammars to make learning Cornish easier and edited some of the surviving Cornish texts.  He also wrote an important series of books aimed at teaching Welsh to English speakers. 
In 1927, he married Dorothea Sophia Bazeley. He died in Worthing and is buried at Amberley, Sussex.

Works 
1925: Welsh Made Easy : a self-instructor for use in the home (in three parts) : Wrexham : Hughes & Son
1939: Cornish Simplified (Kernewek Sempelhes) 
1948: Whethlow an Seyth Den Fur a Rom 
1951: Tristan and Isolt in Cornish verse 
1946: Nebes Whethlow Ber 
1969: The Story of the Cornish Language (Whedhel an Yeth Kernewek) 
 How to Learn Cornish (Fatell dhyskir Kernewek)

References

External links

 
An Independent Academic Study on Cornish; April 2000 EKOS Ltd; SGRÚD Research

1883 births
1950 deaths
Cornish-language writers
Bards of Gorsedh Kernow
20th-century British writers
People from Hurstpierpoint